Ella Atherton may refer to:
 Ella Blaylock Atherton (1860–1933), British-born American physician 
 Ella  Atherton (1905–1995), Scottish-born actress, fashion model, horse breeder, and socialite